The Kala Suri is a Sri Lankan national honour awarded "for special contributions to the development of the arts". It is conventionally used as a title or prefix to the awardee's name. Kala Suri ranks lower than Vidya Nidhi.

Awardees
Awardees include:

1984
 Arisen Ahubudu

1991
 Thangamma Appakutty

1994
Yolande Abeywira

1998
 Jiffry Yoonoos 
 Parakrama Kodituwakku
 Dharmasiri Bandaranayake
 G. S. B. Rani
 S. A D. D. Samarasekera
 D. V. Richard de Silva
 Jayalath Manoratne
 Tissa Abeysekera
 A. Sivanesa Selvan

2005
 Ann Ranasinghe
 Anoma Rajakaruna
 Barbara Sansoni Lewcock
 Chandraguptha Thenuwara
 Channa Wijewardena
 Chitra Ranawake
 Dulip Gabada Mudalige
 Edward Jayakody
 H. A. Perera
 Harsh Makalanda
 Inoka Sathyangani Keerthinanda
 Jagath Weerasinghe
 Janadasa Peiris
 Latha Walpola
 M. A. Nuhuman
 Muhanned Nohideen Abdul Cader
 Nelum Harasgama Nadaraja
 Oosha Saravanamuttu
 Parakrama Niriella
 Pradeep Chandrasiri
 Pushpakumara Kandegedara
 R. Rushankan
 Rajini Selvanayagam
 Rohana Baddage
 Rohanadeva Perera
 Subramanium Vilvaratnam
 Sarath Chandrajeewa
 Somaratne Dissanayake
 Stanley Omar
 Sumathy Sivamohan
 T. Shanathanan
 Udaya Shantha Fernando

References

External links

 
Civil awards and decorations of Sri Lanka